Daniel Gazda (born August 13, 1997) is a Czech professional ice hockey defenceman for PSG Berani Zlín of the Czech Extraliga.

Gazda has been with hometown team since 2012 and made his debut for the senior team during the 2016–17 Czech Extraliga season. He has also had loan spells in Chance Liga for HC ZUBR Přerov and HC RT Torax Poruba and in the 2. Liga for SHK Hodonín.

Gazda signed a long-term extension with Zlín on April 15, 2020.

References

External links

1997 births
Living people
Czech ice hockey defencemen
SHK Hodonín players
HC RT Torax Poruba players
HC ZUBR Přerov players
Sportspeople from Zlín
PSG Berani Zlín players
Ilves players
Czech expatriate ice hockey players in Finland